= Hope Loves Company =

American nonprofit organization

Hope Loves Company is an American 501(c)(3) non-profit organization founded in 2007 that focuses upon providing resources and emotional support to the children and grandchildren of amyotrophic lateral sclerosis (ALS) patients. It is the sole non-profit in the United States with the purpose of providing support and resources to families affected by amyotrophic lateral sclerosis. The organization operates primarily by providing care packages and a free overnight retreat entitled Camp HLC.

== History ==
Hope Loves Company was founded in 2007 by Jodi O'Donnell-Ames. It was created after O'Donnell-Ames lost her husband to ALS in 2001 and realized there were little to no resources available for her daughter, who was three at the time of his diagnosis. In 2003, O'Donnell-Ames remarried to Warren Benton Ames, who had two children and lost his wife to ALS in 2000. His wife, Tina Singer Ames, had written a children's book about ALS entitled What Did You Learn Today?. Before beginning Hope Loves Company, this book was one of the sole resources O'Donnell-Ames had viewed for the children of ALS patients, and has now been sent by Hope Loves Company to children within the U.S. and internationally. As of June 2019, Camp HLC has been hosted 19 times in different locations across the U.S.

== Leadership ==
Jodi O'Donnell-Ames is the founder of Hope Loves Company and held the position of president from the organization's beginning in 2007 before stepping down in 2019 to become community engagement director. Tracey Vasile replaced O'Donnell-Ames and currently serves as board president of Hope Loves Company.

== Camp HLC ==
Camp HLC consists of three days spent on an overnight retreat, and is reserved for children and grandchildren who have or had a loved one living with ALS. The camp takes place at varying locations across the United States, and is provided for free by Hope Loves Company and its sponsors. Activities include outdoor climbing, low ropes courses, high ropes courses, ridge hiking, giant swing, tie dye, candle making, night hiking, stream ecology, campfire, canoeing, and boating. Camp HLC also offers "healing circles" led by counselors for children who wish to have additional support during their experience. In addition, campers partake in activities focused on coping skills and wellness, such as yoga and art and music therapy. The camp itself, including meals and activities, is free for families who attend.

== Services ==
Hope Loves Company provides Family Fun Days, which consist of local events where families affected by ALS partake in recreational activities and socialization. They also offer Hug of Hope Care Packages, which are care packages sent to children in families affected by ALS. The packages contain either a stuffed animal or gift card, Hope Loves Company tee shirt, card, Hope Loves Company wristband, literature, snack, and Camp HLC brochure. In addition, they have a Young Ambassador Program for teenagers and young adults ages 15 to 21 who have attended at least one Camp HLC weekend. Young Ambassadors attend meetings and work to spread awareness about ALS and Hope Loves Company. Hope Loves Company also provides the HLC Helpline to support those affected by ALS. The organization has also hosted an HLC Teen Retreat, which took place in 2018 in Titusville, New Jersey. Hope Loves Company also held an HLC Kids Count ALS Conference in 2019 in Hamilton, New Jersey.

== Scholarships ==
The Susan B. Anderson Scholarship is awarded annually to one Young Ambassador. The Young Ambassador must be attending an accredited 2- or 4- year university, and must have followed Susan's example of courage during their ALS journey.

== Educational materials ==
- "What Did You Learn Today?" by Tina Singer-Ames
- "The Stars That Shine" by Jodi O'Donnell-Ames
- "Someone I Love Has ALS: A Family Caregiver Guide" by Jodi O'Donnell-Ames
